The Women's National Basketball Association's (WNBA) steals title is awarded to the player with the highest steals per game (spg) average in a given season. The highest league-leading spg was Teresa Weatherspoon's 3.33 spg in 1998. The lowest league-leading spg was 2.21, achieved by Nykesha Sales and Yolanda Griffith in 2004.

Statistics accurate as of August 15, 2022

See also
List of National Basketball Association career steals leaders
List of National Basketball Association season steals leaders

External links 
 WNBA Year-by-Year Leaders and Records for Steals Per Game by Basketball-Reference.com

Lists of Women's National Basketball Association players
Women's National Basketball Association statistics